Polymerase (RNA) III (DNA directed) polypeptide G (32kD) is a protein that in humans is encoded by the POLR3G gene.

Model organisms
Model organisms have been used in the study of POLR3G function. A conditional knockout mouse line called Polr3gtm1a(EUCOMM)Wtsi was generated at the Wellcome Trust Sanger Institute. Male and female animals underwent a standardized phenotypic screen to determine the effects of deletion. Additional screens performed:  - In-depth immunological phenotyping

References

Further reading 

Human proteins